The Schedule J of the Drugs and Cosmetics Rules, 1945 of India contains a list of diseases and ailments which a drug may not claim to prevent or cure. Under Rule 106 of the Drugs and Cosmetics Act, 1940, a drug cannot make claims to treat or prevent any of the diseases or reform the conditions listed.

List 
According to the last changes introduced in 1996 by the Government of India by the Notification No. G.S.R. 21(E), the list as follows:

Notable verdicts
The Kerala High Court in December 2001 responding to a Public Interest Litigation restrained one T. A. Majeed, proprietor of the Kochi-based Fair Pharma, from manufacturing and marketing a drug called Immuno-QR, which he claimed to cure HIV/AIDS, or any drug under Schedule J. The manufacturer held a patent for a drug for treating general weakness and fatigue, but not AIDS. The petitioners, People's Union for Civil Liberties, had asked the court the manufacturers should be allowed to sell the Ayurvedic drug only after it has undergone clinical trials, under the supervision of National Institute for Communicable Diseases and the Centre for Advanced Research in Virology.

See also
 Drugs and Magic Remedies (Objectionable Advertisements) Act, 1954
 Drug policy of India

References

Drug control law in India